Fa'atoina Autagavaia (born 18 September 1988) is a Samoan rugby union player. He plays in the fullback (and occasionally wing) position for USO Nevers and for the Samoan national team.

References

1988 births
Living people
Samoan rugby union players
Samoa international rugby union players
Rugby union fullbacks
Northland rugby union players
Northampton Saints players
Samoan expatriate rugby union players
Expatriate rugby union players in England
Expatriate rugby union players in France
Samoan expatriate sportspeople in England
Samoan expatriate sportspeople in France
People from Palauli